The Amalgamated Association of Beamers, Twisters and Drawers (Hand and Machine) (AABTD) was a British trade union which existed between 1866 and 2002. It represented skilled workers in the cotton industry who were responsible for preparing warp yarns prior to weaving.

History
The union was founded in 1866 as the Amalgamated Association of Beamers, Twisters and Drawers by the loose amalgamation of several district unions.  It was reconstituted in 1889, and officially registered the following year.  In 1915, it added "Hand and Machine" to its name.  By this time, it had also affiliated to the United Textile Factory Workers' Association.

The union's large number of affiliates included:

From 1890 until 1932, the union was led by William Cornforth Robinson, a member of the National Executive Committee of the Labour Party, who served two terms as a Member of Parliament.  In the 1940s and 1950s, it was led by Harry Earnshaw, also a member of the National Executive Committee.

Although union membership was never large, it remained fairly steady into the 1950s, being 3,924 in 1955.  However, it dropped rapidly from the 1960s onwards, as employment in the cotton industry in England declined.  Many affiliates merged with each other, with the Blackburn and Bolton Districts of the Amalgamation becoming the largest single affiliate.  However, that union was suspended from the Trades Union Congress (TUC) in 1972, as it had registered with the government, in defiance of TUC policy.  In response, in 1974, the amalgamation expelled the union, which subsequently collapsed.  The following year, the Colne, Nelson and Preston unions began working together with a common general secretary, as the North East Lancashire and Cumbrian District, representing three-fifths of the remaining membership.  In 1983, they were dissolved, along with the remaining minor affiliates, and the former North East Lancashire and Cumbrian District took over the leadership of the amalgamation.

By 1980, the union had only 1,065 members, and by 1989 this had declined to just 470, although its members were determined not to merge into a larger union.  Given the precipitous decline in membership, it disaffiliated from the Trades Union Congress in 1992, and eventually its remaining members transferred to Manufacturing, Science and Finance in 1998, with the union being formally dissolved in 2002.

General Secretaries
J. Ashton
1890: William C. Robinson
1932: James Stott
1940: Harry Earnshaw
1962: Alan Green
1964: James Bleackley
1968: G. Borrah
1974: F. Sumner
1982: A. Little
1985: Albert H. Edmundson
1991: Tony Brindle

References

Cotton industry in England
Defunct trade unions of the United Kingdom
Cotton industry trade unions
Trade unions established in 1866
Trade unions disestablished in 2002
1866 establishments in the United Kingdom
2002 disestablishments in the United Kingdom
Trade unions based in Lancashire